Hidden Lake Winery is one of the largest wineries in Southern Illinois and was opened to the public in 2005. It stretches across 92 acres of forest.

Hidden Lake Winery is located in Aviston, Illinois, although its address can be entered as any of three towns: Aviston, Germantown, or Trenton. It is one of the largest wineries in the state, both in area and in the number of people visiting. It is a major employer for the people of the local area, and is also a large source of commerce for the town.

Parts of the Winery
Hidden Lake Winery is home to a small vineyard, a winery, two lakes, a banquet hall, a wine tasting room, a restaurant, ten cabins, a pavilion, a sculpture garden, and a forest. The cabins are listed as a "Bed and Breakfast," and include 8 deluxe cabins, and 2 honeymoon cabins.

History

Pre-2004
The area that the winery is built on, called "Silent Forest," is known by a popular story that a bootlegger produced whiskey in the area in the early 1900s. It is also known by local people as a good hunting area, for both game and mushrooms. It is illegal to hunt on private property without express permission of the owner.

2004-2005
Dale Holbrook, the winery's founder, purchased 92 acres of forest, on which was built a private residence and a small warehouse. Dale purchased an alcohol distribution license, and started Hidden Lake Winery in mid-2004, making wine out of his warehouse. It was during this time that he also began building onto the warehouse. The winery was added onto it on June 1, 2005, and ever since it has been adding onto itself.

When the winery opened on June 1, 2005, it began with 82 acres of land, and the two-story cedar building along with the original lake were already on the property. Within a month, over 40 weddings were already booked at the sprouting business. However, the winery still had to import grapes, as its vineyards were not mature enough to produce them on their own. Dale was very nervous about the winery's opening year, being an experienced entrepreneur. "If it doesn't work out, this building will make a great church," he said, quite tongue-in-cheek. "There's plenty of wine right downstairs."

2006-2007

In 2007, Hidden Lake Winery participated in the ART in the Park Festival in Belleville, IL.

In 2007, many wineries in Southern Illinois formed a "wine trail," (a group of wineries working together and advertising for each other in order to promote business for the area) called the Heartland Rivers Wine Trail. Hidden Lake Winery joined the wine trail that same year. "It's good for the local economy," said Holbrook, who added that other businesses are welcome to join the wine trail as associate members. In late August of that year, Hidden Lake Winery hosted the first Illinois Wine Festival. The two-day-long event featured vendors from businesses across the area, such as wineries, photographers and musicians. The event was a success, as the winery continued it, and it is now an annual event, although the winery is no longer a member of the trail.

References

External links
 Official Website

Wineries in Illinois
Companies based in Clinton County, Illinois
Bed and breakfasts in Illinois